Shelburne Moriah Mountain is a mountain located in Coos County, New Hampshire. The mountain is part of the Carter-Moriah Range of the White Mountains, which runs along the northern east side of Pinkham Notch.  Shelburne Moriah is flanked to the southwest by Middle Moriah Mountain. It is the northernmost Moriah Range summit along the Appalachian Trail, which crosses the Androscoggin River at Shelburne, New Hampshire, and continues north into the Mahoosuc Range.

See also

 List of mountains in New Hampshire
 White Mountain National Forest

External links
 
 Shelburne Moriah on Topozone

Mountains of New Hampshire
Mountains of Coös County, New Hampshire